Huang Junxiang (born on 1988) is a Singaporean filmmaker and director. Huang has produced films such as Eric Khoo's Ramen Teh (2018), Mike Wiluan's Buffalo Boys (2018) and the acclaimed film Apprentice (2019) by Boo Junfeng.

Filmography

As producer 
Apprentice (2016) – associate producer
Ramen Teh (2018)
Buffalo Boys (2018)
Piece of Meat (short film, 2019) – co-producer
Tiong Bahru Social Club (2020)

As director 
Piece of Meat (short film co-directed with Jerrold Chong, 2019)

References

External links 
 

1988 births
Living people
Singaporean film directors